These hits topped the Ultratop 50 in 2016.

Ranking of most weeks at number 1

Ranking of most weeks at number 1

See also 
2016 in music

References 

Ultratop 50
Belgium Ultratop 50
2016